The Colorado Mammoth are a lacrosse team based in Denver, Colorado playing in the National Lacrosse League (NLL). The 2023 season is the 36th in franchise history and 20th as the Mammoth (previously the Washington Power, Pittsburgh Crossefire, and Baltimore Thunder).

Final standings

Regular season

Roster

Entry Draft 
The 2022 NLL Entry Draft took place on September 10, 2022. The Colorado Mammoth selected:

References 

Colorado
Colorado Mammoth seasons
Colorado Mammoth